Russell P. Letterman (March 8, 1933 – February 8, 1990) was Democratic member of the Pennsylvania House of Representatives.

References

1990 deaths
Democratic Party members of the Pennsylvania House of Representatives
1933 births
20th-century American politicians